Dapeng New District is an administrative area under the jurisdiction of Longgang District in Shenzhen, Guangdong. The district was created on 30December 2011 with its administration center located on 5 Dapeng Street, Zhongshan Road.

Administrative divisions
The jurisdiction of Dapeng New District includes all of the Dapeng Peninsula, formerly divided into the three subdistricts of Dapeng, Kuichong and Nan'ao, with a total of 25 neighborhoods.

Travel
Dapeng New District's coastline features beaches, islands, reefs, sea cliffs, caves, bridges, columns and other maritime landforms. It has been proclaimed the most beautiful coastal scenery in Guangdong, and is known as the Pearl of Shenzhen and Oriental Hawaii. The Nan'ao coastal area is popular with tourists as well as local fishermen while the two islands of Sanmen and Laishi consist of aboriginal scenery. Local scenic attraction Xichong is also located in the district being noted for its undeveloped beach.

Produce
Dapeng is rich in fresh seafood, especially in Dapeng Bay known for its all year round availability of seafood.

Education
Secondary schools ("middle schools"):
 Dapeng Overseas Chinese Middle School (大鹏华侨中学) in Dapeng Subdistrict
 Kuichong Middle School (葵涌中学) in Kuichong Subdistrict
 Nan'ao Middle School (南澳中学) in Nan'ao Subdistrict,
 Shenzhen School (High School) Affiliated to Renmin University of China (人大附中深圳学校) in Kuichong Subdistrict

Nine-year schools (elementary and junior high schools):
 Shenzhen Yadi School  (亚迪学校) in Kuichong Town
 Buxin School (布新学校) in Dapeng Sub-district
 Xingyu School (星宇学校) in Gaoyuan Community, Kuichong Subdistrict
 Shenzhen School Affiliated to Renmin University of China (人大附中深圳学校), Kuichong Subdistrict

Primary schools:
 Shenzhen Dapeng Central Primary School (深圳市大鹏新区大鹏中心小学) - Dapeng Subdistrict
 Shenzhen Dapeng No. 2 Primary School (深圳市大鹏新区大鹏第二小学) - Dapeng
 Kuichong Central Primary School (葵涌中心小学) - Kuichong
 Kuichong No. 2 Primary School (葵涌第二小学) - Kuichong Subdistrict
 Xichong Primary School (溪涌小学) - Kuichong Subdistrict
 Nan'ao Central Primary School (南澳中心小学) - Nan'ao Subdistrict

References

 
Districts of Shenzhen